Coombe is a place in the London Borough of Croydon, situated south-east of central Croydon, between Addiscombe, Selsdon and Upper Shirley. Formerly a hamlet, since the growth of suburban development the area has become swallowed into the London conurbation and often does not appear on modern map.

Coombe is located between the green spaces of Addington Hills, Lloyd Park, Ballards and Coombe Wood. It is unusual in this part of South London as it has barely been urbanised and has retained its collection of large houses fairly intact. Its rural character is maintained by the woodland aspect of the road and an old cattle trough at the junction of Coombe Lane and Oaks Road. Tramlink, however, runs through Coombe. Coombe Lane, the continuation of Coombe Road, is the principal road. Conduit Lane is an ancient unpaved route that is now a woodland path.

There was an estate at Coombe as far back as 1221, recorded as being held by Richard of Coombe. The name comes from the Old English 'cumb', meaning a valley. In Elizabethan times, it was known as Broad Coombe. In the 17th century, it was owned by the brothers of William Harvey, who first described the circulation of blood.

Early history
In 1722, "Some Persons, digging at a Village call'd Coomb, near Croydon in Surry, found a great Number of Roman Urns, and other Antique Curiosities" (sic). The nearby town of Croydon originally developed due to a Roman road, and part of a Roman road has been found in Coombe Street, Croydon.

The houses of Coombe
Coombe House to the north of the road, it dates back to 1761 and is Grade II listed. It is on the site of an older house, the Harveys' home. William Harvey stayed at the house frequently and had tunnels dug in the grounds in order to meditate in the dark. A 145 ft-deep well in the grounds of the house was said to be used by pilgrims to Canterbury on their journey to join the Pilgrims' Way, having come via the Archbishop's Croydon Palace. A Grade II listed brick icehouse is also in the grounds. Substantial changes were made to the house in the 1830s. It was bought in the 1890s by Frank Lloyd, a newspaper magnate. His father Edward Lloyd founded Lloyd Weekly Newspaper, later known as The Sunday News, and also the Daily Chronicle. He lived in Coombe House for 35 years until his death in 1927. Neighbouring Lloyd Park, created from land bequeathed by Lloyd, is named after him. The house was owned by an NHS Trust and was called Geoffrey Harris House. It is now owned by PACT Educational Trust and, in September 2013 reopened as The Cedars School, an independent all-boys senior school with a Catholic ethos. However the school relocated to Upper Norwood in September 2021. It is now occupied by Oakwood Prep School, also part of PACT Educational Trust.

Coombe Lodge is a Grade II Listed Georgian red brick mansion built by the 1760s.
It was once called Coombe Gate House or Coombe Green House. In 1761, the estate joined with Coombe House and Coombe Farm, an estate that was split and reunited several times. A large conservatory, still there, was added in the late 19th century. After World War II the estate was bought by the County Borough of Croydon, which used the house as a home for the elderly. The Council's Parks Department built the Central Nursery in the grounds, and continued to be used until recently for growing Croydon's plants and making Croypost, the municipal compost. Coombe Lodge was sold in 1988 and is now a restaurant and bar, with a large garden and the conservatory for public seating.

Coombe Wood House was built in 1898 for Arthur Lloyd, brother of Frank Lloyd. Some years later, then-owner William Cash sold the house to Croydon Corporation, which used the house as a convalescent and children's home. It is now a French restaurant, the Château (originally the "Château Napoleon"). The ornamental gardens and 14 acres (57,000 m²) of woodland were kept by the Council and opened to the public in 1948. Coombe Wood Gardens are very popular, with a café in the old stable block, the "Coach House Café".

Coombe Farm is a large farmhouse off Oaks Road, reached via Oaks Lane. Oaks Lane was the former main road, closed by John Maberly of Shirley House in 1803 to increase his privacy. Oaks Road was its replacement and Oaks Lane is now open again to walkers. The building probably dates from the 16th century, with 19th-century additions. In 1893, another brother of Frank Lloyd, Herbert, built a much larger new building with mock-Tudor features beside the original building. The farm is now the centre of Dr. Anwar Ansari's housing services and property development company AA Homes & Housing Limited. There are also old farmhouses and lodges along Oaks Lane.

Towards Croydon

Between Lloyd Park and central Croydon, considerable amounts of 20th-century housing was built, particularly in Park Hill. There were estates here too, with two houses surviving a mile from Coombe itself.

Coombe Cliff on Coombe Road was the home of the Horniman family of tea merchants. John Horniman (1803–1893) and Frederick John Horniman (1835–1906) are known as public benefactors and politicians. Frederick is remembered as the founder of the Horniman Museum. In 1850 John Horniman bought a piece of land known as The Warren and in 1853 he employed the Brown building firm to build a house on the site for him. Coombe Cliff had an important example of a Victorian conservatory with fine ironwork, used for Horniman's plant collection. Its glasswork created a shimmering effect in sunlight. Originally erected in 1894 as a 'lean-to' conservatory, and derelict by 1982, it was dismantled, refurbished and reconstructed as a free-standing conservatory adjacent to the Horniman Museum (in Forest Hill, London) in 1987, where it is in use for recitals, receptions etc.

In 1930 Croydon Corporation purchased the house and gardens for a convalescent home for children, and it had several other uses before finally being used as an adult education centre in 1960. Coombe Cliff's gardens were merged into neighbouring Park Hill and opened to the public.

Coombe Hill House is a red-brick townhouse on Coombe Road, now considered central Croydon but until the 20th century in a rural setting. It was built around 1713 and is attributed to Sir Christopher Wren, although this is likely to be estate agent hype. It was expanded by Robert Amadeus Heath, 2nd Baron Heath, Italian Consul General, in the 19th century before becoming a boys' preparatory school. In 1966 it was bought by Croydon's labour, trade union and co-operative movement and developed into their headquarters, Ruskin House. It retains its sash windows, brick wall and large cedar tree.

Towards Addington 

The Ballards estate was a major landholding to the east of Coombe. Until the Reformation it was Prior Ballards, and then passed to the Leigh family of Addington. In 1872, Charles Hermann Goschen, Lord Lieutenant of the City of London and brother of the prominent politician George Joachim Goschen, 1st Viscount Goschen, bought the estate and built a new mansion, demolishing the old building. In the 1920s, the estate was donated to the trustees of the Warehousemen, Drapers, and Haberdashers, School. The new school, built to the side of the mansion, was designed by Sir Aston Webb, architect of Imperial College. The school is now known as Royal Russell School.

Heathfield House was also bought by Goschen in 1872, who rebuilt the former farmhouse and leased it to his brother Henry, one of the last serving members of the East India Company. The house was sold in 1919 to Howard Houlder a former mayor of Croydon and a member of the Houlder Line shipping family. The property was sold a short time later to a Mr. Costain. In 1937, Raymond Riesco bought the property, creating banks of rhododendrons and a walled garden. Riesco arranged for the house, gardens and farmland to be bought by Croydon Council upon his death and donated his collection of oriental ceramics. The house is now the Council's training centre, with the gardens open to the public. The farm is still cultivated, with part used as horse pasture and the Monks Hill estate built on the eastern end. Part of the grounds are also home to the Croydon Ecology Centre. The house is Grade II listed.

Public transport

With the introduction of Croydon Tramlink the 353 bus route that served Coombe was discontinued beyond Addington Village Interchange leaving Coombe with improved privacy but modest public transport links with tramstops some distance from Coombe. The nearest are Coombe Lane tram stop and Lloyd Park tram stop. The area's train station - Coombe Road railway station - closed in 1983.

Coombe Wood School
In 2018, Coombe Wood School opened on the former playing fields at the junction of Melville Avenue and Coombe Road (close to Lloyd Park). Initially in a temporary structure, construction began on a permanent facility in 2019, expected to open in September 2020.

See also
Lloyd Park (Croydon)
Coombe Wood

External links
Coombe Hill House
Royal Russell school

References

Districts of the London Borough of Croydon
Areas of London